The Hundred-Horse Chestnut is the largest and oldest known chestnut tree in the world. Located on Linguaglossa road in Sant'Alfio, on the eastern slope of Mount Etna in Sicily — only  from the volcano's crater — it is generally believed to be 2,000 to 4,000 years old (4,000 according to botanist Bruno Peyronel from Turin). It is a sweet chestnut (Castanea sativa, family Fagaceae). Guinness World Records has listed it for the record of "Greatest Tree Girth Ever", noting that it had a circumference of 57.9 m (190 ft) when it was measured in 1780. Above ground, the tree has since split into multiple large trunks, but below ground, these trunks still share the same roots.

The tree's name originated from a legend in which a queen of Aragon and her company of 100 knights, during a trip to Mount Etna, were caught in a severe thunderstorm. The entire company is said to have taken shelter under the tree.

History 
The tree is located in the wood of Carpineto, on the eastern slope of the Etna volcano, near zone D of the Etna park.

Several authors of botany agree on its age but not on its age: it would have been between two and four thousand years and, according to the thesis of the Turin botanist Bruno Peyronel, it could be the oldest tree in Europe and the largest in Italy (1982).

The first historical information on the Chestnut of the Hundred Horses is documented as early as the sixteenth century. In 1611 Antonio Filoteo spoke of it, while in 1636, in "Il Mongibello", Pietro Carrera majestically described the trunk and the tree "... capable of accommodating thirty horses inside".

On 21 August 1745, a first act was issued by the "Court of the Order of the Royal Heritage of Sicily", with which the Chestnut of the Hundred Horses and the nearby Chestnut Nave were institutionally protected. This document is configured, by virtue of the historical period (late eighteenth century), among the first acts - if not the first ever - of environmental protection produced in Sicily.

Literary allusions
The tree and its legend have become the subject of various songs and poems, including the following Sicilian-language description by Catanese poet Giuseppe Borrello (1820–1894):

Another poet from Catania in Sicily, Giuseppe Villaroel (1889–1965), described the tree in the following sonnet (written in Italian):

The 2018 novel The Overstory by American writer Richard Powers includes the line that: "Seven hundred years before, a chestnut in Sicily two hundred feet around sheltered a Spanish queen and her hundred mounted knights from a raging storm."

See also
 List of individual trees
 List of oldest trees

References

External links
 

Castanea
Flora of Sicily
Individual trees in Italy
Italian folklore
Tourist attractions in Sicily
Oldest trees